The SUNY Downstate Health Sciences University (formally, The State University of New York Health Science Center at Brooklyn) is a public medical school in New York City and one of the three components of SUNY Downstate Health Sciences University: University Hospital at Long Island College Hospital, SUNY Downstate at Bay Ridge (formerly Victory Memorial Hospital), and University Hospital of Brooklyn in East Flatbush, whose staffing is provided by SUNY Downstate College of Medicine.

The university includes the College of Medicine, Colleges of Nursing and Health Related Professions, Schools of Graduate Studies and Public Health, and University Hospital of Brooklyn. It is one of seven medical schools located in New York City and the sole medical school in the borough of Brooklyn, serving its 2.6 million residents.

Medical education

SUNY Downstate College of Medicine's Integrated Pathways curriculum addresses several core competencies - Medical Knowledge, Systems Based Practice, Professionalism, Interpersonal & Communications, Practice Based Learning and Improvement and Patient Care. Each of these must be completed to be awarded an M.D.

The college of medicine offers several pathways to graduation including joint degree programs and special tracks including:

MD/Ph.D.
MD/MPH
MD Medical Educators Pathway
MD Clinical Neuroscience Pathway
MD Global Health Pathway

In clinical years students rotate at several different hospitals including:

University Hospital of Brooklyn (in-house)
Kings County Hospital (in-house) (named the first level 1 trauma center in the US and the only level 1 paediatric trauma center in Brooklyn)
Downstate at Bay Ridge (in-house)
Brooklyn Veterans Administration Hospital
Lenox Hill Hospital
North Shore University Hospital
Staten Island University Hospital
New York Methodist Hospital

In 2015, SUNY Downstate students matched to almost 18% of all offered EM/IM combined residency positions. 26 additional students matched to emergency medicine programs at institution including UCLA and the University of Pittsburgh.

College of Medicine admissions

The 2018 entering class averaged an undergraduate GPA of 3.74 and MCAT of 514. In the same cycle 5390 prospective students applied for 203 spots in the first year class.

Student activities

The Anne Kastor Brooklyn Free Clinic 

The Anne Kastor Brooklyn Free Clinic (BFC) is a student-run free clinic operated primarily by the students of the College of Medicine. The BFC offers care and health maintenance screening to the uninsured populations of Brooklyn. The clinic was renamed The Anne Kastor Brooklyn Free Clinic in memory of Anne Kastor who helped founding faculty member of the clinic and passed from ovarian cancer in 2013. So dedicated to the spirit of student run clinics, Dr. Kastor went on to become the Director of the Weil Cornell Community Clinic at Weil Cornell Medical College.

The clinic hosts an annual conference on health seen through the eyes of medicine, art, technology and community called BFC What's Next. The clinic has won multiple awards for its advertisement campaigns including a gold medal in conjunction with CDMiConnect at the 2014 MMM Awards for their "We Need U" campaign and a bronze medal at the CLIO Healthcare Awards.

The BFC operates several clinical, educational and outreach services including:

Women's Health Night - One night per month dedicated to issues of women's health
Work Physical Night - One night per month dedicated providing work clearance and helping increase community productivity
BFC Community Outreach - Engagement in surrounding neighborhood
BFC RISE (Routine Intervention through Screening and Education) - HIV/HCV counseling, syringe exchange counseling and harm reduction. 
Emergency Response - Responsible for clinic mobilization in case of emergency (e.g. mobile clinic establishment in Red Hook during Hurricane Sandy)
Pharmacy Assistance
Patient Education and Health Promotion

Arthur Ashe Institute for Urban Health
In 1992, Arthur Ashe established the Institute in partnership with SUNY Downstate intentionally.

Downstate Ethics Society

In partnership with the John Conley Division of Medical Ethics and Humanities at the medical center, the society aims to expose students to ethical issues surrounding all aspects of health care.

Other clubs and organizations

Clubs and societies at SUNY Downstate are not limited to the college of medicine but also involve the other schools at SUNY Downstate including the College of Health Related Professions (CHRP), College of Nursing, School of Graduate Studies and School of Public Health. Clubs are tailored to a diverse range of interests including human rights, music, ethnic dialogues, ethics, specialty interest groups and global health among many other things. Keriann Shalvoy of the class of 2017 currently sits on the Board of Directors for Physicians for a National Health Program - NY Metro.

Facilities

The College of Medicine is located at 450 Clarkson Avenue in the East Flatbush neighborhood of Brooklyn. Most of the preclinical learning activities take place in the Health Sciences Education Building located at 395 Lenox Road.

Clinical rotations take place at University Hospital of Brooklyn (UHB); the main teaching hospital at SUNY Downstate, Kings County Hospital Center, located just across the street from UHB, the Brooklyn Veteran's Administration Hospital, Staten Island University Hospital among other places.

History

SUNY Downstate College of Medicine was founded in 1860 as the Long Island College Hospital school of medicine. The site where the Downstate Medical Center stands was purchased in 1946. In 1950 the State University merged with Long Island College Hospital to form SUNY Downstate Medical Center.

Notable physicians and researchers

References

Schools of medicine in New York City
Educational institutions established in 1860
Flatbush, Brooklyn

1860 establishments in New York (state)